Night Train is a 2009 direct-to-video mystery thriller film produced by Rifkin-Eberts Productions and stars Danny Glover, Leelee Sobieski, Steve Zahn and Matthias Schweighöfer. It pays homage to a variety of classic suspense films such as Strangers on a Train (1951), The Lady Vanishes (1938), and The Maltese Falcon (1941), though the plot bears only passing resemblance to any of them. The film did not appear in theaters and was released on DVD for US markets in July 2009.

Plot
One Christmas night, a man runs through a forest carrying something. A nearly deserted train pulls into a station, and two conductors get out, take a stretch, and kill time as no one seems to board. Just as the train is about to depart, the running man calls out, runs to the train, and seems to want to board. He does not speak and, assuming that perhaps he does not know English, the conductors let him on with the intention of getting his money later. He joins two of the only five passengers who appear to be on the train at that point. One of the passengers, an inebriated salesman named Pete (Steve Zahn), offers the man a drink. The man downs a mouthful of pills, then washes them down with the vodka. Soon after, the man dies as a result of ingesting Seconal combined with alcohol, which causes his heart and lungs to stop working.

Upon this discovery, Pete and another passenger, medical student Chloe (Leelee Sobieski), locate the head conductor, Miles (Danny Glover), and alert him to what has happened. Miles intends to call the authorities at the next stop, but Pete discovers a mysterious object in the box the dead man was carrying and, peering inside, is intrigued. Chloe also looks inside the object and they immediately, convinced that there is a liberating fortune inside, scheme for ways to keep it. They suggest the idea to Miles, who tells them they're crazy and takes the object and the box it was in back to his office, purportedly to keep it safe and call the authorities, but he too peers inside and his will is overcome.

With a crazed Chloe taking the lead, the three decide to dispose of the man's body and keep the treasure for themselves. Their only problems now are keeping anyone else from finding out, warding off the other suspicious passengers as well as the other conductor, and keeping a close eye on one another, as paranoia takes hold and the box's influence continues to do its work.

Eventually, it is revealed that the box contains a supernatural force of some kind, and that whoever looks into it sees what would tempt them the most, dooming them to corruption and death before dawn. The last survivor, Miles, lives only long enough to attempt to destroy the device by placing it in the path of an oncoming train, but dies just after seeing it nudged off the tracks by a curious dog.

Ultimately, a random toddler-age child wandering alone in the middle of nowhere, miles from any city, town, or train station, picks up the box, looks inside, and smiles.

Cast
 Danny Glover as Miles
 Leelee Sobieski as Chloe
 Steve Zahn as Pete
 Matthias Schweighöfer as Frankie
 Takatsuna Mukai as Hiro
 Togo Igawa as Yamashita
 Richard O'Brien as Mrs. Froy
 Jo Marr as Mr. Cairo
 Constantine Gregory as Mr. Gutman
 Harry Anichkin as Walter
 Geoff Bell as Detective

External links
 
  
 

2009 films
2009 independent films
2000s mystery thriller films
2000s supernatural horror films
American independent films
American Christmas horror films
American mystery thriller films
American supernatural thriller films
Crime horror films
Films set on trains
Films shot in Bulgaria
American mystery horror films
2000s English-language films
2000s American films